Skeeter is a 1993 horror film starring Jim Youngs and Tracy Griffith and directed by Clark Brandon. The film was released in 1993, with the first video premiere being on April 6, 1994. It was panned by critics.

The film was released on DVD as a stand-alone in the United States by Image Entertainment. It was also released in 2007 on DVD as the first film in the triple feature with the 1982 low-budget British science-fiction horror movie Xtro and its 1990 sequel Xtro II: The Second Encounter.

Plot
Drake is a corrupt and greedy developer who is illegally dumping toxic waste into the mines around the small town of Clear Sky, causing mosquitoes to mutate into giant beasts that attack and kill anything, including humans. A lawman of the town sheriff, Roy Boone, and his reunited love Sarah Crosby, must put a stop to both the pollution and the bugs. The body counts keep rising, which causes the locals to feel that they have to move out of the city. Crosby and environmental inspector Gordon Perry try to find the origin of the waste, but certain people try to prevent them for doing so due to Drake's evil deeds, which involves some hitmen.

Cast
 Jim Youngs as Roy Boone
 Tracy Griffith as Sarah Crosby
 Charles Napier as Ernie Buckle
 Jay Robinson as Drake
 William Sanderson as Gordon Perry
 Michael J. Pollard as Hopper
 Eloy Casados as Hank Tucker
 John Putch as Hamilton
 Saxon Trainor as Dr. Jill Wyle
 Stacy Edwards as Mary Ann
 John F. Goff as Clay Crosby
 George 'Buck' Flower as Filo
 Eric Lawson as Frank O'Connell
 Lindsay Fisher as Chrissy O'Connell
 Barbara Baldavin as Dorothy O'Connell
 Larry Stevens as Trevor O'Connell
 Michael D'Agosta as Bo
 Joe McCutcheon as Wil
 Jane Abbott as Esther
 Robert Snively as Luther
 Mia St. John as Charlie
 John Ingle as The Preacher

Reception
Skeeter was largely panned by critics. AllMovie gave the film two and a half stars out of five and wrote "Part of the same "third wave" of eco-kill horror films which spawned the superior Ticks, Aberration, and Spiders, this giant mosquito film is similarly hamstrung by too much plot about environmental crime and not enough scares." The site summed up the film saying, "The concept of giant blood-sucking insects certainly has the potential to give viewers the screaming meemies, but time and again the potential is undercut by pious environmental speeches and pointless subplots more suitable to a frontier Western than a horror film. The best films in the eco-kill subgenre use nature's revenge as subtext, but Brandon pushes it full-tilt into the foreground and the result is a real bore."

Billboard reviewed the film in March 1994 as part of the "Marquee Values" section, created as a guide to the lesser-known rental-priced films of the time, saying, "While taking baby steps toward humor, this mightily confused fright flick should have gone for Tremors-like laughs and upped its special effects budget. (It might also have taken an interest in its obligatory evil land-developer subplot and dropped the romantic subplot that stops the movie dead. It should draw out the SF mavens, who probably will remain indifferent to the film's periodic skeeter-cam shots."

Both Emanuel Levy and Rob Vaux of Flipside Movie Emporium gave the film two out of five stars; Scott Weinberg of eFilmCritic.com	gave the film three out of five stars. TV Guide (Triangle Publications) gave the film one out of five stars.

References

External links
 

1993 films
1993 horror films
1990s monster movies
American monster movies
1990s English-language films
1990s American films
Films about mosquitoes